The European Football League (EFL) established in 1986, was a tournament for the best European American football teams affiliated to IFAF (International Federation of American Football - Europe), which replaced the European Federation of American Football (EFAF) in 2014.

Until 2013, the final game of the EFL was the Eurobowl, which has been held annually since 1986. In 2014, the EFL was replaced as Europe's top-tier club competition by the new BIG6 European Football League and the EFL Bowl was introduced as the new final game of the EFL. The 2018 EFL season was the last edition of the tournament.

EFL 
Under the governance of EFAF, the best American Football teams in Europe participate in annual competitions. Until 2013, the EFL was the first-tier competition for American football clubs in Europe. EFAF determined the relative strength of each of its 17 affiliate leagues and allocated teams to the 4 divisions accordingly, thus not all nations took part. National league champions, runners-up or teams with international success were eligible for the EFL. Teams from 'weaker' leagues could take part in the EFAF Cup. The final game of the EFL was the Eurobowl, which has been held annually since 1986.

In 2014, the BIG6 European Football League was introduced as the new top-tier competition  of American football in Europe. The EFL continued to be played as a second-tier competition, with its teams playing for the newly created EFL Bowl trophy. The inaugural EFL Bowl was won by the Kiel Baltic Hurricanes of Germany against Spain's Badalona Dracs on 20 July 2014.

From 2017 on, the EFL Bowl winners may play a relegation game against the last placed team of the BIG6, and be promoted to the BIG6 if they win. This relegation game never happened.

Format
Until 2013, Teams were split into 4 divisions of 3 or 2 teams. In a division of 3, teams played 2 matches; once at home to one opponent and the other away to the other opponent. In a division of 2 teams, each team played each other home and away. The division winners then advanced to the play-offs.

The play-off format was changed for the 2008 season. The tournament was expanded to an eight-team competition. The two finalists from the 2007 season, Vienna Vikings and Marburg Mercenaries, earned automatic berths for the next season and the two semi-finalists, Eidsvoll 1814's from Norway and Tirol Raiders from Austria, earned a spot for the national champions of their respective countries. In quarterfinals these teams faced the four winners of the divisional round. In semi-finals teams were paired by the Eurobowl seeding system, with the best-seeded team facing the worst and the second-best facing the second-worst. Winners then advanced to the Eurobowl.

With the start of the Big6 in 2014, the format of the EFL changed again. Six teams played in two divisions of three teams. The winners of the groups advanced to the EFL Bowl.

EFL Bowls

For a list of champions by year before 2014, see Eurobowl.

Records and statistics

By club

 † Listed are Eurobowls from 1986 to 2013 and EFL Bowls from 2014 on.

By country

See also

Eurobowl
German Football League
EFAF
Austrian Football League
Italian Football League

References

External links 

 European Football League

 
1986 establishments in Europe
Sports leagues established in 1986
American football leagues in Europe